Marianapolis Preparatory  School is a private, co-educational, Catholic high school located in Thompson, Connecticut.

Notable alumni

Ike Azotam, professional basketball player
Tyler Burton, college basketball player for the Richmond Spiders 
Gerard Cowhig, NFL player
Chris Flores, professional basketball player
Michael Mallory, professional basketball player
George Tobin, NFL player
Greg Senat, NFL player

References

External links
 
 Roman Catholic Diocese of Norwich

Educational institutions established in 1926
Catholic secondary schools in Connecticut
Schools in Windham County, Connecticut
Thompson, Connecticut
1926 establishments in Connecticut
Boarding schools in Connecticut
Catholic boarding schools in the United States